Bharat Bharati Vidyashram School is a school in Sikar.

Buildings and structures in Sikar district
Private schools in Rajasthan
2001 establishments in Rajasthan
Educational institutions established in 2001
Education in Sikar